MINExpo International is a trade show sponsored by the National Mining Association.  The show exhibits the latest mining and minerals processing technologies, and state-of-the-art machinery and equipment for the coal, metal and nonmetal mining processing industries.

History
MINExpo International is held every four years and has been held at the Las Vegas Convention Center since 1996.  The 2008 MINExpo drew over 44,000 people (an increase of over 44% from the previous show in 2004) and 1,025 exhibitors in an area of 

 MINExpo 2000
Terex THS15 Motorscraper

References

Mining organizations
Las Vegas Valley conventions and trade shows
Quadrennial events